Pimonte is a comune (municipality) in the Metropolitan City of Naples in the Italian region Campania, located about 30 km southeast of Naples.

Geography
The municipality of Pimonte, located in Sorrento Peninsula, contains the frazioni (subdivisions, mainly villages and hamlets) Centro, Franche, Piazza and Tralia. Centro, meaning center and also known as Pimonte proper, is te municipal seat.

Pimonte borders the following municipalities: Agerola, Castellammare di Stabia, Gragnano, Positano, Scala and Vico Equense.

References

External links

Official website

Cities and towns in Campania